Moon Child is a 1989 Spanish fantasy film directed by Agustí Villaronga. It was entered into the 1989 Cannes Film Festival.

Cast
 Maribel Martín - Victoria
 Lisa Gerrard - Georgina
 Enrique Saldaña - David
 Lucia Bosé - Directora
 David Sust - Edgar
 Mary Carrillo - Anciana carbonera
 Günter Meisner - Abuelo militar
 Heidi Ben Amar - Mid-e-mid
 Lydia Azzopardi - Abuela mora
 Jack Birkett - Inválido
 Lluís Homar - Hombre 1 cabaña
 Albert Dueso - Hombre 2 cabaña
 Joaquim Cardona - Director Orfanato
 Lydia Zimmermann - Cuidadora Centro

References

External links
 

1989 films
1989 fantasy films
1980s Spanish-language films
Spanish fantasy films
Films directed by Agustí Villaronga
1980s Spanish films